In statistics, a Galbraith plot (also known as Galbraith's radial plot or just radial plot) is one way of displaying several estimates of the same quantity that have different standard errors.

It can be used to examine heterogeneity in a meta-analysis, as an alternative or supplement to a forest plot.

A Galbraith plot is produced by first calculating the standardized estimates or z-statistics by dividing each estimate by its standard error (SE). The Galbraith plot is then a scatter plot of each z-statistic (vertical axis) against 1/SE (horizontal axis). Larger studies (with smaller SE and larger 1/SE) will be observed to aggregate away from the origin.

See also 
 Plot
 Funnel plot

References

External links 
Galbraith plots are available within the metafor package in R, along with various other diagnostic and summary plots. 
MIX 2.0 Software to perform meta-analysis and create Galbraith plots in Excel.
RadialPlotter Java application for fission track, luminescence and other radial plots from P. Vermeesch.
RadialPlotter() function within the R package 'numOSL' from Peng Jun for statistical age models analysis in optically stimulated luminescence dating.
plot_RadialPlot() function within the R package 'Luminescence' to produce Galbraith plots.

Further reading

 Galbraith, R.F., 1990. The radial plot: Graphical assessment of spread in ages. International Journal of Radiation Applications and Instrumentation. Part D. Nuclear Tracks and Radiation Measurements, 17 (3), pp. 207–214. .
 Galbraith, R. & Green, P., 1990. Estimating the component ages in a finite mixture. International Journal of Radiation Applications and Instrumentation. Part D. Nuclear Tracks and Radiation Measurements, 17 (3), pp. 197–206. 
 Galbraith, R.F. & Laslett, G.M., 1993. Statistical models for mixed fission track ages. Nuclear Tracks And Radiation Measurements, 21 (4), pp. 459–470. 
 Galbraith, R.F., 1994. Some Applications of Radial Plots. Journal of the American Statistical Association, 89 (428), pp. 1232–1242. 
 Galbraith, R.F., 2010. On plotting OSL equivalent doses. Ancient TL, 28 (1), pp. 1–10. PDF on Ancient TL website
 Galbraith, R.F. & Roberts, R.G., 2012. Statistical aspects of equivalent dose and error calculation and display in OSL dating: An overview and some recommendations. Quaternary Geochronology, 11, pp. 1–27. 

Statistical charts and diagrams
Meta-analysis